"The Dream Shall Never Die" was a speech delivered by U.S. Senator Ted Kennedy during the 1980 Democratic National Convention at Madison Square Garden, New York City. In his address, Kennedy defended post-World War II liberalism, advocated for a national healthcare insurance model, criticized retired Hollywood film actor and Republican presidential nominee Ronald Reagan, and implicitly rebuked incumbent President Jimmy Carter, for his more moderate political stances. It has been remembered by some as Kennedy's best speech, and is one of the most memorable political speeches in modern American history.

Background 

August 12 was devoted to platform debate. It began in the morning with social issues, and contentiously shifted to economic policies. Both the Carter delegate majority and the Kennedy delegate minority had six speakers to propose policies and counter the others' arguments. The final majority spokesman was United States Ambassador to the United Nations Andrew Young, whose words were drowned out by increasingly intense pro-Kennedy chants, which did not stop until Representative Barbara Mikulski introduced Kennedy, who himself was to make the minority's final economic comments.

The speech

Composition 
According to Bernard K. Duffy and Richard Leeman, the first draft of the speech was created by Carey Parker and Bob Shrum. Kennedy made additions, which were taken by Arthur M. Schlesinger Jr. and Ted Sorensen and made into the final draft. Kennedy rehearsed the speech with a teleprompter twice, once in his hotel and again at the convention site.

Kennedy remembered the process somewhat differently, stating in a 2005 interview that the original speech was continuously altered, starting from before the convention when Carter declined to participate in a debate and instead suggested that differences be expressed during the platform committees. That night Kennedy and his sisters Jean, Pat, and Eunice began piecing together a new speech, with Shrum filling in where necessary. This supposedly continued every night until the platform arguments.

Summary 
Kennedy spoke for thirty-two minutes. He opened his speech by conceding the end of his presidential campaign:

Kennedy criticized Ronald Reagan's ideas and nostalgically appealed to a defense of old liberal values:

Kennedy later developed his argument by displaying his role as a spokesperson for Democratic voters. To do this, he employed prosopopoeia, telling real life stories of people he had met while campaigning. Shrum would maintain that this technique was new at the time and later popularized by Reagan:

Towards the end of the speech, Kennedy made his only mention of Carter in an unenthusiastic non-endorsement:

The crowd applauded and then fell silent. As Kennedy finished, he mentioned his two older brothers, John and Robert, something he usually avoided doing:

Kennedy had been interrupted by cheers and applause a total of fifty-one times. He would later write that the delegates' response was "warm and generous". Sustained applause and cheers followed his speech for half an hour.

Aftermath 
The following day Carter told state and local officials during a reception at Sheraton Centre Hotel that "Last night after one of the greatest speeches I have ever heard I called Senator Kennedy and told him how much I appreciated it. Ours is a nation, ours is a party well-represented by thousands of people like you who believe in the greatness of the United States, and who believe in openness, debate, controversy, courage, conviction and who believe in their future, and are not afraid to express your will in the most open, democratic and greatest party on earth. I'm grateful to you for that."

Reagan ended up defeating Carter in a landslide of 489 electoral votes to 49, or 50.7% to 41% of the popular vote.

Legacy 
The speech is considered the most famous of Kennedy's life and senatorial career and laid the foundation for the modern platform of the Democratic Party. Schlesinger would write in his diary that he "had never heard Ted deliver a better speech." Former campaign aide Joe Trippi later said, "In a lot of ways, a whole country of young people were inspired that day." It is often considered to be one of the most effective political orations in modern American history. Kennedy's speech was ranked as the 76th best American speech of the 20th century in a 1999 survey of academics. According to Robert S. McElvaine, "It was a great speech to read or to hear in the arena, but it was considerably less effective on television."

Kennedy also referenced his words during the endorsement he made for Barack Obama at the 2008 Democratic National Convention, saying, "the work begins anew, the hope rises again and the dream lives on". Following Kennedy's death in 2009, many media outlets circulated footage of the closing remarks of his speech.

Citations

References

External links 
Audio and transcript of the speech

Ted Kennedy
1980 speeches
1980 United States Democratic presidential primaries
August 1980 events in the United States